The Mulanthuruthy Marthoman Orthodox Syrian Cathedral is located at Mulanthuruthy in Ernakulam district in Kerala, India. This church was founded and established in the 11th century A.D,the church was consecrated on 3rd Karkkidakkam (July), in between 1100 and 1125 A.D. The church was modified in the 16th century A.D. The carvings on the main door of the church, made of granite, on which is inscribed in Syrian script, read as ʹʹthe door of the Mar Thoman Church was re-erected on 9th Thulam 1575 A.D.ʹʹ It is one of the ancient Churches in Kerala.

The church is a fine example of Gothic architecture. The carvings, sculptures, symbolic icons and lovely wall paintings, are a blend of Indian, West-Asian and European architecture.

The altar of the church with wooden carvings and paintings of unique design, are reminiscent of the church at Jerusalem. There is a massive sculptural covering on the eastern side of the main altar, with carvings of faces of cherubins and representations of the Holy Father, the Son and the Holy Spirit.

The floor tiles are important from abroad. The rare antique paintings on the ceiling above, have their-own stories to narrate.

The baptism stand of this church, is chopped out of a huge granite and it is about thousand years old. The two stories parish building is about three hundred years old. It's wooden walls and sculptured ceiling, as well as, its strong room have with-stood the ravages of time.

The St. Gregorios Retreat Centre in the church compound, is an example of modern architecture.

A proud heritage of the church is the head circlets for the bride and the bridegroom on the occasion of their marriage. These were in vogue from the time of Knai Thoma and his contemporaries.

Even though Christianity was rooted in this country from the 1st century onwards, there was no constitution or rules and regulations for the church. This vacuum was filled by Ignatius Peter III, Patriarch of Antioch. He came to Malankara and convened the famous Mulanthuruthy Synod in 1876 A.D. at this church, in which, an association was formed by name Syrian Christian Association and a democratic set-up for the administration of the Malankara Church, was adopted. Holy Mooron was consecrated by the Malankara Church, for the first time in India. Holy Mooron was again consecrated here, in 1911 A.D, by Igatius Abdulla II, Patriarch of Antioch.

In appreciation of the historical importance of this church and of its contributions to Malankara Church patriarchs honoured it with the appellation 'The Second Jerusalem'.

Ignatius Yakoob III Patriarch of Antioch, also visited this church in 1964.

The Patriarch of Antioch, Ignatius Zakka III visited Mulanthuruthy four times, in 1982, 2000, 2004 and 2008.

History
The church was established in 11th century and modified in 16th century (in 1550) by the Knanaya Tharakan (minister) Kunchacko of the Kunnassery family. Due to an altercation between the Syrian Christians and the Kingdom of Vadakkumkur Kunchacko had gathered the Knanaya of Kaduthuruthy Church as well as all Syrian Christians he could find within Vadakkumkur and moved them to Mulanthuruthy. Upon arrival Kunchacko had sanctioned the building of the Mulanthuruthy Church. Later the Knanaya were called back to their home church of Kaduthuruthy by the descendants of the King of Vadakkumkur, leaving Mulanthuruthy Church in the care of the Syrian Christians who remained there.

The church is home to a relic of Thomas the Apostle, which was brought from Mosul and given as a gift by the then Patriarch of Antioch. The church also contains tombs of Mor Kurilos Yuyakim from tur'abdin, Mor Ivanius Hidayatulla (Patriarchal Delegates of Malankara), Mor Gregorius Yuhanan the Patriarch of Jerusalem and relics of Parumala Mar Gregorios entombed at Parumala Church and Ignatius Elias III the Patriarch of Antioch entombed at Manjinikkara Church. Pilgrims visit the church to view the murals and the tombs of holy fathers.

Mulanthuruthy church is having a prominent place in Malankara Church history. This church was the venue of the Mulanthuruthy Synod held on the year 1876. Ownership of this church was under dispute after the splits in Malankara Church into the Patriarch and Metropolitan factions of the Malankara Orthodox Syrian Church and the factions had been engaged in dispute over ownership of many churches including Mulanthuruthy Church. Mulanthuruthy Church was illegally kept by the Patriarch faction. In 2017, the Supreme Court of India had ruled in favour of the Orthodox faction in the century-old dispute on the ownership of the churches. In August 2020, Ernakulam district administration took the possession of the church as per the direction from Kerala High Court and later handed over the control of the church to Malankara Orthodox Syrian Church.

Location
The nearest railway station is Mulanthuruthy Railway Station.

Gregorios of Parumala

Geevarghese Gregorios took charge of the Niranam Diocese and started staying at Parumala. He established various churches and was the motivator to establish schools in different parts of Kerala including St. Thomas School at Mulanthuruthy. On 2 November 1902, at the age of 54, Gregorios died. He was entombed at St. Peter's and St. Paul's Orthodox Syrian Church, Parumala. Considering the saintly life and many testimonies to the intercession of Gregorios, the Malankara Orthodox Syrian Church (in 1947) canonized Gregorios as a saint.

References

Sources
 
 

12th-century establishments in India
Churches in Ernakulam district
Cathedrals in Kerala
Churches completed in 1550
16th-century churches in India